Nicolas-Henri Tardieu, called the "Tardieu the elder", (18 January 1674 - 27 January 1749) was a prominent French engraver, known for his sensitive reproductions of Antoine Watteau's paintings.  He was appointed graveur du roi (King's Engraver) to King Louis XV of France.  His second wife, Marie-Anne Horthemels, came from a family that included engravers and painters.  She is known as an engraver in her own right.  Nicolas-Henri and Marie-Anne Tardieu had many descendants who were noted artists, most of them engravers.

Biography

Nicolas-Henri Tardieu was born in Paris on 18 January 1674 and was baptized three days later.
He was the son of Nicolas Tardieu, bourgeois de Paris, and Marie Aymiée [sic].
His father was a boilermaker, as were his two younger brothers.
Possibly Nicolas-Henri used scraps of copper from his father's workshop for his early engravings.
He was a student of Pierre Lepautre, Gérard Audran and Benoit Audran.
Tardieu married  Louise-Françoise Aveline, daughter of Jean Aveline and a relative of the engraver Pierre Aveline, on 1 September 1706 in the church of Saint-Jacques-du-Haut-Pas.  Louise-Françoise was the widow of Laurent Baron, the commissioner of the oratory.  
Louise had two children from her first marriage, and had just one with Tardieu, Denis, born on 31 August 1707.
She died on 18 November 1708.

On 20 October 1712 Tardieu married again, to Marie-Anne Horthemels.
She was the widow of the pastry-maker Germain Le Coq, who had worked for King Louis XIV of France (1638–1715) and for the Duchess of Burgundy.
Marie-Anne was one of three daughters of the Dutch bookseller Daniel Horthemels. 
Her sister Louise-Magdeleine Horthemels was an active reproductive engraver who married Charles-Nicolas Cochin, graveur du roi.
Her other sister married Alexis Simon Belle, peintre ordinaire du roi.
His second wife had a talent for engraving, and is known for her portraits of Cardinal de Bissy, Cardinal de Rohan and the Regent Philippe II, Duke of Orléans.  She died on 24 March 1727.

Tardieu was accredited to the Academy on 29 October 1712.
He was received as a member of the Royal Academy and graveur du roi (official engraver to King Louis XV of France) on 29 November 1720 for his "Engraved portrait of the Duke of Antin" (Louis Antoine de Pardaillan de Gondrin), after a painting by Hyacinthe Rigaud.
As one of the most prominent engravers of his time, Tardieu was commissioned to engrave plates for several major publications.
He made engravings for the Crozat Collection and the Galerie de Versailles.

Tardieu died on 27 January 1749 at his house on the Rue Saint-Jacques in Paris and was buried the next day.
He was survived by his brother, Claude Tardieu, and his son, Jacques-Nicolas Tardieu.

Legacy

Tardieu had four sons, each of whom passed on the tradition of engraving or other arts to their descendants.
He had taught his son Jacques-Nicolas Tardieu (1718-1759), also a designer and engraver, who was appointed graveur ordinaire du roi.
Tardieu also taught engraving to his nephew, Pierre François Tardieu (c.1711 - 1774).
The engraver Bernard Baron (1700-1762) was another of his pupils who gained distinction in his profession.
Laurent Cars and Jacques-Philippe Le Bas were also pupils, later to be teachers themselves.
His grandson Jean-Charles Tardieu became a well-known painter.
The last of the line of "clever engravers" that he founded died in 1844.

Jean-Baptiste van Loo painted Tardieu's portrait, which was placed in the galleries of Versailles.

Work

Of at least eight engravers by the name of Tardieu, Nicolas-Henri was the most notable, 
one of the most prominent engravers in France for his versatile use of point and graver.
He was author of many engravings of the highest quality.
Tardieu held true to the principles of his master, Gérard Audran.
He was an opponent of the fashionable trend towards less serious subjects, and attempted to pass on his traditionalist views to his pupils.
Tardieu engraved several of Watteau's paintings.
His version of Champs Elysées and Embarcation for Cythera are excellent interpretations of Watteau's work as etchings.
Tardieu had an extraordinary ability to retain the "silvery" atmosphere of Watteau's paintings in his engravings.

Prints

Some of his best prints include:

Portraits
Louis-Antoine, Duke D'Antin after Rigaud, engraved for his reception plate at the Academy in 1720
Jean Soanen, Bishop of Senez, made from the life 1716
An embematical Subject, representing the principal qualifications of a perfect Minister: Secrecy, Fortitude and Prudence after Eustache Le Sueur

Classical subjects

Embarkation for Cythera (L'Embarquement pour Cythère) after Antoine Watteau
Alexander's Battles (set) after Charles Le Brun
Four subjects of Roman history, in the form of friezes after Rinaldo Mantovano
Jupiter and Alemene after Giulio Romano
Apollo and Daphne after Charles-Antoine Coypel
The Wrath of Achilles after Antoine Coypel
The Parting of Hector and Andromache after Antoine Coypel
Vulcan presenting to Venus Armour for Aeneas after Antoine Coypel
Venus soliciting Jupiter in favour of Aeneas after Antoine Coypel
Juno directing Aeolus to raise a Tempest against the Fleet of Aeneas after Antoine Coypel

Religious subjects

The Annunciation after Carlo Maratta
The Holy Family, with Angels presenting Flowers and Fruit after Andrea di Aloigi
Adam and Eve after Domenichino
The Scourging of Christ after Charles Le Brun
The Crucifixion after Charles Le Brun
Christ and the Woman of Samaria after Nicolas Bertin
Christ appearing to Mary Magdalene (Apparition de Jésus à Madeleine) after Nicolas Bertin
The Martyrdom of St. Peter after Sébastien Bourdon
The Crucifixion after Joseph Parrocel
The Conception after Antoine Coypel

Other works

Other works that have been preserved include: 
 Gravures, 1738
 Saint Jérôme dans la caverne, 1741, after the painting by Pierre Dulin in the chapel of l’abbé Bignon at Filles Saint-Thomas
 Portrait du R. P. Pollard, prêtre de l’Oratoire 1742, drawn and engraved by the same artist
 La croix qui apparait dans le ciel à l’empereur Constantin lorsqu’il se préparait à déclarer la guerre au tyran Maxence (from the cabinet of the duc d’Orléans)
 Baptême de Constantin
 Double mariage de Constantin Chlorus, père de Constantin et de Maximien Galère César, 1743
 La Ville de Rome reçoit la couronne de l’Empire des mains de la Victoire à l’entrée de Constantin
 Entrevue de Constantin et de Crispe, son fils, à Byzance
 La Bataille de Constantin contre Maxence, 1745
 La Défaite de Maxence et sa chute dans le Tibre
 Vue de la ville de Beauvais, after a pastel by Jean-Baptiste Oudry, 1747
 Vue de l’abbaye de Poissy du côté de la forêt de Saint-Germain, 1748, after a pastel by Oudry
 Un plafond du Palais-Royal, after Charles-Antoine Coypel
 Recueil historié des hommes illustres d’Angleterre, after Italian and French drawings
 Le Sacre de Louis XV

Gallery

References
Citations

Sources

1674 births
1749 deaths
17th-century French engravers
18th-century French engravers